Ali Forsyth (born 11 December 1979) is a New Zealand international lawn and indoor bowler.

Bowls career
Forsyth from Nelson, in New Zealand, first came to prominence when winning the New Zealand national title which qualified him to compete in the 2004 World Singles Champion of Champions. He won the gold medal defeating David Anderson of Scotland in the final.

World Championships
He then won a bronze medal in the singles at the 2008 World Outdoor Bowls Championship and a bronze in the triples at the 2012 World Outdoor Bowls Championship in Adelaide. In 2016, he won his sixth national title including the pairs with his father Neville.

In 2016, he won a bronze medal at the 2016 World Outdoor Bowls Championship in Christchurch in the triples with Blake Signal and Mike Nagy before winning a gold medal in the fours with Signal, Nagy and Mike Kernaghan.

In 2020 he was selected for the 2020 World Outdoor Bowls Championship in Australia.

Commonwealth Games
He was selected as part of the New Zealand team for the 2018 Commonwealth Games on the Gold Coast in Queensland. In 2022, he competed in the men's triples and the men's fours at the 2022 Commonwealth Games.

Asia Pacific Championships
Forsyth has won seven medals at the Asia Pacific Bowls Championships, including two gold medals in the singles and a double silver in the triples and fours at the 2019 Asia Pacific Bowls Championships in the Gold Coast, Queensland.

National
At national level Forsyth has won nine titles at the New Zealand National Bowls Championships when bowling for the various bowls clubs. They are the 2003, 2004 and 2013/14 singles for the United and Havelock Bowls Clubs respectively; the pairs three times in 2012/13, 2015/16 and 2017/18 and the fours three times in 2010/11, 2011/12 and 2017/18.

References

External links
 
 
 

1979 births
New Zealand male bowls players
Living people
Bowls World Champions
Commonwealth Games competitors for New Zealand
Bowls players at the 2010 Commonwealth Games
Bowls players at the 2014 Commonwealth Games
Bowls players at the 2018 Commonwealth Games
Bowls players at the 2022 Commonwealth Games